Semi-submersible may refer to a self-propelled vessel, such as:

Heavy-lift ship, which partially submerge to allow their cargo (another ship) to float into place for transport
Narco-submarine, some of which remained partially on the surface
Semi-submarine, which cannot fully submerge
Semi-submersible naval vessel, which partially submerges to minimize being observed
Semi-submersible platform, which is typically transported to a location where it is placed in service
Oil platform,  a large structure with facilities for well drilling to explore, extract, store, and process petroleum and natural gas, in deeper water (more than 1,500 metres (4,900 ft)), the semisubmersibles or drillships are maintained at the required drilling location using dynamic positioning.

See also
 Submarine boat
 Submersible boat

 Boat types
 Nautical terminology
Submarines by type